The Bolsa de Valores de Asunción (BVA) (Asunción Stock Exchange) is a stock exchange located in Asunción, the capital city of Paraguay.

History
The Bolsa de Valores de Asunción (BVA), then known as Bolsa de Valores y Productos de Asunción (BVPASA), was founded by the Cámara Nacional de Comercio y Servicios del Paraguay (National Chamber of Commerce and Services of Paraguay) on 28 September 1977. After a long period without market activity, in 1991 the Law N° 94/91 of Paraguayan Stock Market was approved, setting legal requirements for the engagement of market operations.

See also
Economy of Paraguay
List of stock exchanges
List of American stock exchanges

References

External links
   

1977 establishments in Paraguay
Financial services companies established in 1977
Stock exchanges in South America
Companies based in Asunción
Economy of Paraguay
Financial services companies of Paraguay